Carla Makhlouf Obermeyer is a medical anthropologist and epidemiologist specializing in the study of fertility and HIV. A former associate professor of Population and International Health at Harvard University, Obermeyer was director of the Center for Research on Population and Health at the American University of Beirut as of 2013. She has also worked for the World Health Organization's Department of HIV/AIDS.

Obermeyer is the editor of Family, Gender and Population in the Middle East (1995) and Cultural Perspectives on Reproductive Health (2001). She has called for more rigorous studies into the health effects of female genital mutilation.

Education
1988, D.Sc. Harvard School of Public Health, Population, Maternal / Child Health, Behavioral Sciences
1983, M.Sc. Epidemiology, American University of Beirut
1976, M.A. Anthropology, American University of Beirut
1973 B.A. Sociology (with distinction), American University of Beirut

References

Further reading
Obermeyer, Carla. "Female Genital Surgeries: The Known, the Unknown and the Unknowable", Medical Anthropology Quarterly, 31(1), 1999, pp. 79–106. 
Obermeyer, Carla. "The Health Consequences of Female Circumcision: Science, Advocacy, and Standards of Evidence", Medical Anthropology Quarterly, 17(3), September 2002, pp. 394–412. 
Obermeyer, Carla. "The Consequences of Female Circumcision for Health and Sexuality: An Update on the Evidence", Medical Anthropology Quarterly, 7(5), September–October 2005, pp. 443–461. 
Jacobson, Jodi L.; Ibrahim, Barbara; and Obermeyer, Carla Makhlouf. "The Muslim Woman: Fighting For Faith and Family Planning" , The Washington Post, 4 September 1994.

Medical anthropologists
Female genital mutilation
Living people
Harvard School of Public Health faculty
Harvard School of Public Health alumni
American University of Beirut alumni
Year of birth missing (living people)